The 1999 AFC Futsal Championship was held in Kuala Lumpur, Malaysia from 5 March to 10 March 1999.

Venue

Draw

Group stage

Group A

Group B

Knockout stage

Semi-finals

Third place play-off

Final

Awards 

Top Scorers
 Kazem Mohammadi (18 goals)
 Reza Rezaei Kamal (18 goals)

References

 Futsal Planet

AFC Futsal Championship
F
Championship
International futsal competitions hosted by Malaysia
1990s in Kuala Lumpur
Sport in Kuala Lumpur